Earthwalk is an album by drummer Jack DeJohnette's Special Edition, featuring alto saxophonist Greg Osby, tenor saxophonist Gary Thomas, pianist Michael Cain and bassist Lonnie Plaxico, recorded in 1991 and released on the Blue Note label.

Track listing
All compositions by Jack DeJohnette
 "It's Time to Wake Up and Dream" – 5:30  
 "Blue" – 6:18  
 "Where or Wayne" – 9:44  
 "Priestesses of the Mist" – 7:44  
 "Earth Walk" – 13:05  
 "On Golden Beams" – 5:16  
 "One on One" – 11:18  
 "Lydia" – 2:24  
 "Monk's Plumb" – 12:08  
 "It's Time to Wake Up and Dream" [Alternate Version] – 0:50  
Recorded at Dreamland Recording Studios, West Hurley, NY in June 1991

Personnel
Jack DeJohnette – drums
Michael Cain – midi piano, korg keyboards
Gary Thomas – tenor saxophone, flute
Greg Osby – alto saxophone, soprano saxophone
Lonnie Plaxico – electric bass, acoustic bass
Joan Henry – animal sound on "Earth Walk"

References

Jack DeJohnette albums
1991 albums
Blue Note Records albums